Sekiu is an unincorporated community and census-designated place in Clallam County, Washington, United States. As of the 2010 census it had a population of 27. Overlooking the west side of Clallam Bay and the Strait of Juan de Fuca, it is twinned with the community of Clallam Bay, on the east side of the bay.

The term "Sekiu" first appears as Sekou Pt on Henry Kellett's chart of 1846. Sekiu was first settled in 1879 by J.A. Martin who attempted to establish a salmon cannery there. Leather tanning and logging were other early industries in the area.

Sekiu has a small year-round population and is known primarily as a summer tourist destination for fishing, kayaking, birdwatching and diving.

Climate
The climate in this area has mild differences between highs and lows, and there is adequate rainfall year-round.  According to the Köppen Climate Classification system, Sekiu has a marine west coast climate, abbreviated "Cfb" on climate maps.

References

External links
 Clallam Bay - Sekiu Chamber of Commerce
 History at Sekiu, Clallam County, Washington
 Port of Port Angeles - Sekiu Airport
 The Traveling Twins videoclip on Sekiu

Census-designated places in Washington (state)
Census-designated places in Clallam County, Washington
Populated coastal places in Washington (state)